{{DISPLAYTITLE:C3H3N}}
The molecular formula C3H3N (molar mass: 53.06 g/mol, exact mass: 53.0266 u) may refer to:

 Acrylonitrile
 Azete